Elise Mary Sherwell ( Laverick, born 27 July 1975 in Rustington, West Sussex) is a British rower.  She won bronze at the 2004 Summer Olympics in the double scull with Sarah Winckless, and again at the 2008 Summer Olympics with Anna Bebington.  She won the Wingfield Sculls in 2007.

Early life and education
Laverick was educated at Broadwater Manor School in Worthing for the early years of her youth and later at Rosemead School. She also studied the Double Bass at the Guildhall School of Music and Drama and later qualified as a Solicitor while training with British Olympic rowing team.

Rowing career
Laverick won a bronze medal at the 2004 Summer Olympics in the double scull with Sarah Winckless, and again at the 2008 Summer Olympics with Anna Bebington where they missed the Gold Medal by 4 inches.

She won the Championship of the ThamesWingfield Sculls on the Thames in 2007.

She is a member of Thames Rowing Club in Putney, London, Leander Club at Henley and of Thames Valley Skiff Club at Walton on Thames and is also a former Skiff Champion.

References

English female rowers
Olympic rowers of Great Britain
Rowers at the 2000 Summer Olympics
Rowers at the 2004 Summer Olympics
Rowers at the 2008 Summer Olympics
Olympic bronze medallists for Great Britain
1975 births
Living people
Olympic medalists in rowing
Medalists at the 2008 Summer Olympics
Medalists at the 2004 Summer Olympics
Alumni of the Guildhall School of Music and Drama
World Rowing Championships medalists for Great Britain